Outlaw Anthems is the fourth studio album by Blood for Blood, and was released on January 15, 2002.

Track listing
All songs written by White Trash Rob, except where noted.
 "Post Card From The Edge" - 3:13
 "Mother Dear" - 1:49
 "Ain‘t Like You (Wasted Youth II)" - 3:29
 "Dead End Street" - 2:57
 "White Trash Anthem" - 3:37
 "So Common, So Cheap" - 2:54
 "Tear Out My Eyes" - 1:43
 "Some Kind Of Hate" - 3:18
 "Love Song" - 3:46
 "Bloodshed" (originally by the Bruisers. Lyrics adjustments by Rob, Buddha) - 3:29
 "She‘s Still A Bitch (Called Hope)" (Rob, Buddha) - 3:32

2002 albums
Blood for Blood albums